The 2009 Città di Como Challenger was a professional tennis tournament played on outdoor red clay courts. It was the fourth edition of the tournament which was part of the 2009 ATP Challenger Tour. It took place in Como, Italy between 31 August and 6 September 2009.

Singles entrants

Seeds

 Rankings are as of August 24, 2009.

Other entrants
The following players received wildcards into the singles main draw:
  Carlos Berlocq
  Daniele Bracciali
  Thomas Fabbiano
  Matteo Trevisan

The following players received wildcards into the singles main draw:
  Leonardo Tavares

The following players received entry from the qualifying draw:
  Jonathan Eysseric
  Adrián García
  Malek Jaziri
  Cecil Mamiit

Champions

Singles

 Oleksandr Dolgopolov Jr. def.  Juan-Martín Aranguren, 7–5, 7–6(5)

Doubles

 Marco Crugnola /  Alessandro Motti def.  Treat Conrad Huey /  Harsh Mankad, 7–6(3), 6–3

External links
Official site
ITF Search 

Citta di Como Challenger
Clay court tennis tournaments
Città di Como Challenger
Città di Como Challenger
Città di Como Challenger
Città di Como Challenger